Iacob a Labano fugiens is a 1791 oratorio by Simon Mayr to a libretto by Giuseppe Maria Foppa for the Conservatorio dei Mendicanti, Venice.

Recordings
 Iacob a Labano fugiens. Franz Hauk. 1CD Naxos

References

1791 compositions
Oratorios by Simon Mayr